Follow Me TV may refer to:

Follow Me TV (Canada), multicultural Canadian TV station
Follow Me TV (Taiwan), now known as FTV One, Taiwanese digital TV station, aimed to offer realtime traffic information to audiences, especially drivers with TV device on vehicle